India competed at the 2018 Winter Olympics in Pyeongchang, South Korea, from 9 to 25 February 2018. The Indian team consisted of two male athletes competing in two sports.

Competitors
The following is the list of number of competitors participating in the delegation per sport.

Cross-country skiing 

India qualified one male cross-country skier, Jagdish Singh.

Distance

Luge

Shiva Keshavan qualified in men's singles by being ranked in the top 38 of the 2017–18 Luge World Cup standings. Keshavan qualified for his sixth Winter Olympics in the sport. This will be Keshavan's final Olympics appearance as an athlete.

See also
India at the 2017 Asian Winter Games
India at the 2018 Summer Youth Olympics

References

Nations at the 2018 Winter Olympics
2018 in Indian sport
2018